The , also known as the , was a light caliber naval gun of the Imperial Japanese Navy used during World War II, employed on the aircraft carrier , the light cruiser , and  destroyers. The gun was considered by the Japanese to be their finest anti-aircraft artillery weapon. After the end of World War II, the gun remained in service on the two Japanese destroyers ceded to the Soviet Union and the Republic of China as war reparations.

The Allied forces first captured a shore-based twin-mounting of this weapon at Iwo Jima.

Description 
The 100 mm (3.9 in) L/65 caliber Type 98 gun utilized a horizontal sliding breech, in addition to either monobloc (made from a single forging) or replaceable liner construction of the barrel. The gun featured a spring-powered rammer that was cocked by means of the recoil of the gun being fired; this allowed the rammer to load the gun at any elevation. 

116 guns went to ship based mounts: 12 for Taiho and 8 each on Oyodo and the 12 Akizuki-class destroyers. A shortcoming of the gun was that it had a service life of only 350-400 full charges, due to its high muzzle velocity.

Mountings 
These guns were used in twin gun turrets. The mount installed on Akizuki could traverse at 12° to 16° per second and could elevate at a rate of 16° per second. It was electro-hydraulically powered and could be moved by hand in the event of an emergency.

Ammunition 
Only nose-fused high-explosive ammunition was developed for the gun.

Notes

References

External links 
10 cm/65 (3.9") Type 98

World War II naval weapons
Naval anti-aircraft guns
Naval guns of Japan
100 mm artillery
Military equipment introduced in the 1930s